The Roman Catholic Diocese of Jhabua is a diocese located in the city of Jhabua in the Ecclesiastical province of Bhopal in India.

History
 25 March 2002: Established as Diocese of Jhabua from the Diocese of Indore and Diocese of Udaipur

Leadership
 Bishops of Jhabua (Latin Rite)
 Bishop Chacko Thottumarickal, S.V.D. (25 March 2002 – 24 October 2008)
 Bishop Devprasad John Ganawa, S.V.D. (11 May 2009 – 21 December 2012)
 Bishop Basil Bhuriya, S.V.D. (18 July 2015 – 6 May 2021)

References

External links
 GCatholic.org 
 Catholic Hierarchy 
  Diocese website 

Roman Catholic dioceses in India
Christian organizations established in 2002
Roman Catholic dioceses and prelatures established in the 21st century
2002 establishments in Madhya Pradesh
Christianity in Madhya Pradesh
Jhabua